Marmaroglypha is a genus of longhorn beetles of the subfamily Lamiinae, containing the following species:

 Marmaroglypha densepunctata Breuning, 1948
 Marmaroglypha fasciata (Pascoe, 1869)
 Marmaroglypha nicobarica Redtenbacher, 1868
 Marmaroglypha sumatrana Ritsema, 1888
 Marmaroglypha vermiculata Breuning, 1948

References

Lamiini